Frankfurt Egelsbach Airport  is a general aviation airport located near Egelsbach, a town in the German state of Hesse.

History

The airport was opened in 1955 with a single grass runway. It proved popular, and by 1957 was already seeing 37,000 movements a year.  Because of this, in 1966, an asphalt runway was constructed and by 1977 the number of movements had increased to 126,000 a year.  In 2007, about 77,000 movements were made, making it the busiest airport for general aviation in Germany.

To allow for larger aircraft to land, in 2004 construction was started on a runway expansion, which increased the runway length to its current . In May 2009, NetJets Europe announced that they intended to purchase the airport.

Today NetJets owns 80% of the aerodrome (the other 20% being owned by the local authorities of Egelsbach and Langen) and intends to establish IFR procedures at the airport, including an ILS approach.

Facilities
It has two runways, both in the 08/26 direction (though no left (L) or right (R) markings or indicators are used): a  asphalt runway and a  grass runway.

Airlines and destinations
There are no scheduled services to and from Frankfurt Egelsbach Airport.

Accidents and incidents
All five people on board were killed. The reason for the crash is unknown.
 On 30 June 2015, a Diamond DA20 Katana experienced problems during takeoff and struck the overhead wires on the adjacent Main-Neckar Railway. The plane crashed and was then hit by a goods train. The pilot was severely injured and the co-pilot died.
 On 31 March 2019, an Epic LT crashed while landing. The chairwoman and co-owner of S7 Airlines Natalia Fileva, died in the crash along with two other people on board.

See also
 Transport in Germany
 List of airports in Germany

References

External links

 Official website

Airports established in 1955
1955 establishments in West Germany
Egelsbach